Gol-e Khatr (also Romanized as Gol-e Khāţr and Gol Khāţer; also known as Gol-e Khāţū') is a village in Howmeh-ye Sarpol Rural District, in the Central District of Sarpol-e Zahab County, Kermanshah Province, Iran. At the 2006 census, its population was 32, in 6 families.

References 

Populated places in Sarpol-e Zahab County